Schismatodiplosis is genus of flies in the family of gall midges Cecidomyiidae.

Species
Some species of this genus are:
 Schismatodiplosis lantanae (Rübsaamen, 1908)
 Schismatodiplosis marctiae  Tavares, 1917

References 

Cecidomyiidae genera